José Ramón Amieva Gálvez (born 30 August 1972) is a Mexican lawyer and politician affiliated with the National Regeneration Movement and the current municipal president of Mixquiahuala de Juárez, Hidalgo. He previously served as the interim mayor of Mexico City in 2018.

References

1972 births
Living people
21st-century Mexican politicians
Heads of Government of Mexico City
Morena (political party) politicians
Party of the Democratic Revolution politicians
Politicians from Hidalgo (state)